Grassy Creek, North Carolina may refer to:

Grassy Creek, Ashe County, North Carolina, an unincorporated community
Grassy Creek, Granville County, North Carolina, site of several buildings listed on the National Register of Historic Places in Granville County
Grassy Creek (North Carolina), a stream in Surry County, North Carolina